The Asahi-class destroyer escort was a class of destroyer escorts of Japanese Maritime Self-Defense Force.

Description 
In 1951, General Matthew Ridgway, Supreme Commander of the Allied Forces, proposed to lend a patrol frigate (PF) and a landing support boat (LSSL) to Japan under Allied occupation. In response to this, on April 26, 1952, the Coastal Safety Force was established within the Japan Coast Guard to serve as a receiver for these warships and as the base of the future Navy. Then, with the establishment of the National Safety Agency on August 1, the same year, the Coast Guard absorbed the route enlightenment department of the Japan Coast Guard and was reorganized into a security force, and together with the National Police Reserve (later the National Safety Force), which is a land unit, of the National Safety Agency.

Of the rented vessels, all 18 PF vessels were delivered in 1953 and commissioned as comb-type guard vessels, which later became the starting point for the development of the Maritime Self-Defense Force escort vessels. In the budget for 1952, which is the year when the guards were established, the construction of support vessels (water vessels, heavy oil vessels, etc.) to improve the operational base of these guard vessels was prioritized, and the construction of combat ships was not carried out. Although domestic construction of security vessels began in 1953, the construction in the same year was two 1,600-ton instep security vessels and 1,000-ton B-type security vessels (JDS Akebono and ) It was fastened to 3 ships.

After that, the US-Japan Ship Loan Agreement was signed on May 14, 1954, and two Livermore-class destroyers and two s were to be rented. This type is the one that recommissioned this Cannon class.

Ships in the class

Gallery

References 

Frigate classes
Frigates of the Japan Maritime Self-Defense Force
Cannon-class destroyer escorts of the Japan Maritime Self-Defense Force